Lê Văn Hoạch (189 – 1978) was a Vietnamese politician who served as president of Cochinchina from 1946 to 1947. 

Hoạch took over the premiership on 6 December 1946 after the death of Nguyen Van Thinh. He was succeeded by Nguyễn Văn Xuân.

References 

1890s births
1978 deaths
Presidents of Vietnam
Prime Ministers of Vietnam
People from Cần Thơ